Justice Ross may refer to:

Jonathan Ross (senator), chief justice of the Vermont Supreme Court
Erskine Mayo Ross, associate justice of the Supreme Court of California
Henry D. Ross, associate justice and chief justice of the Arizona Supreme Court
John Wilson Ross, associate justice of the Arizona Supreme Court